Buddleja euryphylla is a species endemic to cloud forest in El Salvador, Guatemala and Honduras; it was first described and named by Standley & Steyermark in 1947.

Description
Buddleja euryphylla is a dioecious tree 8–15 m high, and closely related to B. cordata. The young branches are quadrangular, tomentose only at the apex. The ovate to ovate elliptic leaves have 3–7 cm petioles, and are 15–27 cm long by 8–16 cm wide, glabrous above, tomentose below. The yellow inflorescences are 20–30 cm long by 20–30 cm wide, paniculate with three to four orders of leafy-bracted branches, bearing short cymules each 0.4–0.6 cm in diameter with usually three flowers; the corolla tubes are 2–2.5 mm long.

Cultivation
The species is not known to be in cultivation.

References

euryphylla
Flora of El Salvador
Flora of Guatemala
Flora of Honduras
Flora of Central America
Dioecious plants